Saroma may refer to:

Saroma, Hokkaido
Lake Saroma
5059 Saroma